is the eighth single by Japanese girl group NMB48. It was released on October 2, 2013, and reached the number one on the weekly Oricon Singles Chart.

Background 
Kamonegikkusu means "Kamo ga negi wo shotte kuru" (lit. a duck comes carrying a Welsh onion on its back) is a Japanese proverb that means a stroke of luck occurs, and things become more and more convenient. According to NMB48 member Sayaka Yamamoto, "The title was a coined word by Yasushi Akimoto".  It is a song about a girl who despite being a convenience just like Kamonegi, does not learn from her mistakes and falls in love."

Due to restrictions from Avex Trax, full version MV from main track is included only in limited editions, and wasn't released on YouTube. Instead, an alternative dance version with an entire song was released.

Release 
The single was released in four versions: Type-A, Type-B, Type-C and Theater Edition.

Track listing

Personnel

"Kamonegikkusu" 
(Center Position: Sayaka Yamamoto)

Members participating in this single are:
 Team N: Mayu Ogasawara, Kanako Kadowaki, Riho Kotani, Kei Jōnishi, Miru Shiroma, Sayaka Yamamoto, Akari Yoshida 
 Team M: Yui Takano, Koromo, Airi Tanigawa, Keira Yogi, Nana Yamada 
 Team BII: Yūka Katō, Shū Yabushita 
 Team N / AKB48 Team B: Miyuki Watanabe, Miori Ichikawa 
 Team M / AKB48 Team A: Fūko Yagura

"Sunglass to Uchiakebanashi" 
 Kenkyūsei: Natsuko Akashi, Yuumi Ishida, Mizuki Uno, Mai Odan, Noa Ogawa, Chihiro Kawakami, Nagisa Shibuya, Momoka Shimazaki, Riko Takayama, Honoka Terui, Hiromi Nakagawa, Reina Nakano, Rurina Nishizawa, Momoka Hayashi, Chiho Matsuoka, Megumi Matsumura, Arisa Miura, Ayaka Morita, Rina Yamao

"Doshaburi no Seishun no Naka de" 
Shirogumi
(Center Position: Sayaka Yamamoto)
 Team N：Rika Kishino, Haruna Kinoshita, Aika Nishimura, Sayaka Yamamoto
 Team M: Ayaka Okita, Ayaka Murakami, Natsumi Yamagishi, Nana Yamada
 Team BII: Anna Ijiri, Mirei Ueda, Emika Kamieda
 Kenkyūsei: Hiromi Nakagawa

"Omowase Kousen" 
Akagumi
(Center Position: Miyuki Watanabe)
 Team N: Rina Kondo, Yuuki Yamaguchi, Miyuki Watanabe
 Team M: Rena Kawakami, Momoka Kinoshita, Rena Shimada, Mao Mita, Fuuko Yagura
 Team BII: Yuuri Ota, Rina Kushiro
 Kenkyūsei: Mai Odan, Rina Yamao

"Mou Hadashi ni Hanarenai" 
Namba Teppoutai Sono 4
(Center Position: Sae Murase, Nagisa Shibuya)
 Team M: Sae Murase
 Team BII: Hono Akazawa, Konomi Kusaka, Rikako Kobayashi, Kanako Muro
 Kenkyūsei: Chihiro Kawakami, Nagisa Shibuya, Momoka Hayashi

"Jikan wa Katari Hajimeru" 
 Team N: Narumi Koga
 Team M: Yuki Azuma, Arisa Koyanagi
 Team BII: Akari Ishizuka, Mako Umehara, Hazuki Kurokawa, Saki Kono, Tsubasa Yamauchi

Charts

Oricon charts

References

External links 
  at NMB48 official website

2013 singles
Japanese-language songs
Songs written by Yasushi Akimoto
NMB48 songs
Oricon Weekly number-one singles
2013 songs